San Siro 2007 is Italian singer Laura Pausini's second live album, chronicling her historic performance at Milan's Stadio San Siro on 2 June 2007.
The album was released on 30 November 2007. As of January 2008, the album has sold 120,000 copies in Italy.

Track listing

Disc 1 (DVD)

Disc 2 (CD)

Charts

Weekly charts

Year-end charts

References 

Laura Pausini live albums
2007 video albums
Live video albums
2007 live albums